Meir Shalev (born 29 July 1948)  is an Israeli writer and newspaper columnist for the daily Yedioth Ahronoth . Shalev's books have been translated into 26 languages.

Biography 
Shalev was born in Nahalal, Israel. Later he lived in Jerusalem and at Ginosar with his family. He is the son of the Jerusalem poet Yitzhak Shalev. 
His cousin Zeruya Shalev is also a writer.

Shalev was drafted into the IDF in 1966, and did his military service in the Golani Brigade. He served as a soldier, a squad leader  in the brigade's reconnaissance company. Shalev fought in The Six Day War, and a few months after the war was injured in a friendly fire incident.

He began his career by presenting ironic features on television and radio. He also moderated the program Erev Shabbat ("Friday night") on Israel channel one. His first novel, The Blue Mountain, was published in 1988.

Shalev also writes non-fiction, children's books and a weekly column in the weekend edition of Yediot Ahronot.

He currently lives in the Jezreel Valley.

Views and opinions
According to a January 2009 interview, Shalev identifies with the Israeli left and believes that the conflict with the Palestinians can be resolved by establishing two states for two peoples. However, he is disappointed with the extremism in the Palestinian camp, saying, "Radical Palestinians still say that the only solution would be for all Jews to pack their bags and return to where their grandparents came from. When there are no more Jews left in the Middle East, then the problem is solved, according to their logic. As long as they continue to think that way, there will be no peace. We are here and we are going to stay. Only after that fact is generally accepted can progress be made."

Awards and recognition
 Bernstein Prize (original Hebrew novel category) (1989) 
 Brenner Prize (Israel) for A Pigeon and a Boy
National Jewish Book Award for A Pigeon and a Boy (2007)
 Chevalier of the Ordre des Arts et des Lettres, along with Michal Govrin, in 2018

Published works

Fiction 

 1988 The Blue Mountain  (1988, originally published in Hebrew as Roman Rusi) English translation in 1991 by Hillel Halkin. Reprinted, 2010
 1991 Esau  
 1994 As a Few Days, also called The Four Meals or The Loves of Judith 
 1998 His House in the Desert (or "Alone in the Desert")
 2002 Fontanelle 
 2006 A Pigeon and A Boy (originally published in Hebrew as Yona v'naar by Am Oved Publishers, Tel Aviv), translated by Evan Fallenberg, Random House, New York, 
 2013 Two She-Bears

Non-fiction 
 
 1985 Bible Now, a book containing interpretations of Hebrew Bible stories from his personal point of view, which first appeared in the newspaper Haaretz.
      Elements of Conjuration
 1995 Mainly About Love
 1998 My Jerusalem
 2008 In the Beginning: Firsts in the Bible
 2011 Beginnings:  Reflections on the Bible's Intriguing Firsts     (Nonfiction)
 2011 My Russian Grandmother and Her American Vacuum Cleaner     
 2017 My Wild Garden

Children's books 
 
 1982 Michael and the Monster of Jerusalem 
 1987 Zohar's Dimples
 1988 My Father Always Embarrasses Me
 1990 Nehama the Louse
 1993 How the Neanderthal Inadvertently Invented Kebab
 1994 A flood, a snake and two arks
 2021 “A Snake, a Flood, a Hidden Baby” (Eng, Kalaniot Books, USA)
 1995 The Tractor in the Sandbox
 2000 Aunt Michal
 2004 A lion at night
 2004 Roni and Nomi and the Bear Yaacov
      A Louise Named Thelma
      A Lion in the Night
 2007 Uncle Aaron and his rain

References 

Meir Shalev in duet with jazz guitarist Dekel Bor

External links
 "You were caught with your trousers down in a war of your own making", speech at Tel Aviv mass rally, May 2007

1948 births
Living people
Bernstein Prize recipients
Brenner Prize recipients
Hebrew-language writers
Israeli children's writers
Israeli Jews
Israeli novelists
Jewish writers
Modern Hebrew writers
People from Nahalal
20th-century novelists